Pavlo Tsyrkunenko (born 10 July 1991) is a professional Ukrainian football defender who played for the Ukrainian Premier League club Volyn Lutsk.

Career
Tsyrkunenko attended the different Sportive youth schools in Kyiv. He made his debut for FC Volyn Lutsk played as substituted in the game against FC CSKA Kyiv on 18 April 2008 in Ukrainian First League.

References

External links 

Ukrainian footballers
Ukrainian Premier League players
FC Volyn Lutsk players
Association football defenders
1991 births
Living people
Footballers from Kyiv